Caleb Cartwright (1696? – 25 August 1763) was an Irish academic and clergyman, who was the second
Erasmus Smith's Professor of Natural and Experimental Philosophy at Trinity College Dublin (TCD), serving from 1738–1743.

Life and career
Caleb Cartwright was born in Cork, son of Charles Cartwright.  He matriculated at TCD on 7 July 1716 at the age of 19.  He received BA (1720), MA (1723) and DD (1735) from that institution.  He was elected a Fellow in 1724, served as Donegall Lecturer in Mathematics (1735–1738), was appointed Senior Dean in 1737, and second Erasmus Smith's Professor of Natural and Experimental Philosophy (1738–1743). He resigned from TCD in 1743 and spent the rest of his life as a clergyman in the parish of Clonmethan, north Dublin.

References

Alumni of Trinity College Dublin
Donegall Lecturers of Mathematics at Trinity College Dublin
Academics of Trinity College Dublin
Fellows of Trinity College Dublin
People from County Cork
1696 births
1763 deaths